Aroj Ali Matubbar (17 December 190015 March 1985) was a self-taught philosopher and rationalist from Bangladesh.

Early life and education
Matubbar was born in the village of Charbaria Lamchari, about from the city of Barisal in British India, now Bangladesh, to a poor peasant family. His original name was Aroj Ali; he later adopted the name Matubbar (meaning "local landowner"). He studied for only a few months at the village maqtab, where he focused on the Qur'an and Islamic studies.

Matubbar lost his father at a young age. He was later evicted from his ancestral homestead by a local usurper. Matubbar survived through charity and by working as a farm laborer.

He could not afford to attend school and relied on free maqtab religious instruction at a local mosque. He did not accept the rigid learning methods, and therefore left the mosque. A benefactor helped him finish the Bengali primers. Matubbar continued to read extensively after that. Philosophy was the subject that interested him the most. A philosophy teacher at B M College, Kazi Ghulam Quadir helped him borrow books from the college library.

Philosophy
Matubbar developed a very progressive approach and wrote against ignorance, superstition, and religious fundamentalism. He was considered an iconoclast because he wrote against established religious ideologies. For example, he questioned Islamic inheritance law because he could not reconcile the proposed way of dividing inherited property.

Aroj Ali wrote several books reflecting his controversial philosophy about life and the world. He also befriended a number of communist politicians and academics in the city of Barisal, including Professor Kazi Golam Kadir and Professor Muhammad Shamsul Haque. His books often ran the risk of being banned by the government because they contained certain assertions that conflicted with the religious beliefs of the majority. Matubbar was arrested and placed in police custody for his book Sotyer Shondhaney (The Search for Truth). He was harassed and threatened throughout his life, due to his writings, as many of them challenged religious statements and claims.

Career
Due to financial constraints, Matubbar was unable to take academic courses or obtain a formal institutional degree. He lived primarily by subsistence farming. Matubbar learned surveying techniques and became a private land surveyor in his community. This enabled him to accumulate capital and own a piece of land to farm.

Death
Matubbar died on 15 March 1985 (1st Chaitra of the Bengali year 1392) in Barisal, Bangladesh. After his death, he donated his eyes for transplantation. He donated his body which was received by the Anatomy Department of Sher-e-Bangla Medical College and used by medical students for dissection. After his death in 1985, Aroj Ali Matubbar came to be regarded as one of the most prolific thinkers that rural Bangladesh ever produced, and an iconoclast who was not afraid of speaking out against entrenched beliefs and superstitions.

Satyer Sandhane
Matubbar drew the cover of his first book, written in 1952 and published twenty-one years later, in 1973, under the title Satyer Sandhane. In the preface he wrote:

“I was thinking of many things, my mind was full of questions, but haphazardly. I then started jotting down questions, not for writing a book, but only to remember these questions later. Those questions were driving my mind towards an endless ocean and I was gradually drifting away from the fold of religion.”

He made six propositions in this book, which reflected the nature of his philosophical questions. These are:

Proposition 1 : dealt with the soul, containing 8 questionsProposition 2 : dealt with God, containing as many as 11 questionsProposition 3 : dealt with the after-world, containing as many as 7 questionsProposition 4 : dealt with religious matters, containing as many as 22 questionsProposition 5 : dealt with Nature, containing as many as 10 questionsProposition 6 : dealt with remaining matters, containing as many as 9 questions

The eight questions he posed in the first proposition exemplify his approach. These are (a) Who am I (self)?, (b) Is Life incorporeal or corporal ? (c) Is mind and his/soul one, and the same? (d) What is the relationship of life with the body and the mind? (e) Can we recognize or identify life? (f) Am I free? (g) Will the soul without body continue to have "knowledge" even after it leaves the body at death? and finally (h) How does life can come into and go out of the body?

Books
Matubbar was considered an unusual type of writer. In Bangladesh, his writings were censored because they allegedly led to social corruption and disharmony in the community. The following are his writings:
 Shotter Shondhaney (The Quest for Truth) (1973)
 Sristir Rahasya (The Mystery of Creation) (1977)
 Anuman (Estimation) (1983)
 Muktaman (Free Mind) (1988)

Several of his unpublished manuscripts were later published posthumously under the title Aroj Ali Matubbar Rachanabali. Some of his writings were translated into English and compiled in a volume published by Pathak Samabesh.

Recognition and awards
Matubbar was not well known among the educated elite of the country during his lifetime. It was only in the last years of his life that he became known among the academics of the country. His writings were collected and published. The general public began to take an interest in his books, which, although not validated by formal education, raised a number of new philosophical questions. After his death in 1985, he soon became widely known.
 Life Member of Bangla Academy, inducted in 1985;
 Awarded Humayun Kabir Smriti Puraskar (Humayun Kabir Memorial Prize) in 1978 by the Bangladesh Lekhak Shibir;
 Award of Honour by the Barisal branch of Bangladesh Udichi Shilpigoshthi in 1982.

References

External links
 https://arojali.com/

1900 births
1985 deaths
Bangladeshi philosophers
Bangladeshi male writers
Bengali-language writers
Bangladeshi humanists
Bangladeshi agnostics
Honorary Fellows of Bangla Academy
20th-century Bangladeshi philosophers
People from Barisal District